The Myelin Project is a 501(c)(3) nonprofit organization established in 1989 by Augusto Odone and his wife, Michaela. Their son, Lorenzo, suffered from adrenoleukodystrophy (ALD), the most common of the leukodystrophies. The story of the Odones' struggle was dramatized in the 1992 film Lorenzo's Oil.

The Myelin Project has three branches in the United States, Germany, and the United Kingdom. The Myelin Project's scientific advisory committee includes researchers from Yale University and the University of Wisconsin–Madison in the United States, the Istituto Superiore di Sanità and San Raffaele Hospital in Italy, the Hôpital de la Salpêtrière and the Institute Pasteur in France, Queen's University at Kingston in Canada, the University of Cambridge and University of Edinburgh in the United Kingdom, and the Max-Planck-Institut in Germany.

The project's aims
The Myelin Project aims to advance research, advocacy, and family support for ALD and adrenomyeloneuropathy (AMN).

The nonprofit is currently run by a president and board of directors. Patricia Louisell Chapman, current president of the organization, had two brothers die of AMN, and currently has a son, Michael, born in 1979, who began developing symptoms of AMN in 2005 at the age of 26. She was a personal friend of the Odones and was a founding board member of the organization.

See also

Conditions of interest
*Alexander disease
Canavan disease
Krabbe disease
Metachromatic leukodystrophy
Pelizaeus–Merzbacher disease
Phenylketonuria
Refsum disease
Transverse myelitis
Multiple sclerosis
Charcot–Marie–Tooth disease
Arachnoiditis

Treatments investigated
Lorenzo's oil

References

External links
The Myelin Project's home page

Medical and health organizations based in California
Neuroscience projects